Solomon Yambassu (born August 16, 1983 in Koidu Town, Sierra Leone) is a Sierra Leonean footballer, who plays for East End Lions in Sierra Leone National Premier League.

Early life
Yambassu was born Koidu Town, Kono District in Eastern Sierra Leone to parents from the  Kono ethnic group. He was raised in Wellington, a poor Neighbourhood in the east of Freetown. He attended the Wesleyan primary school in Wellington and the Congress Boys secondary school in Thunder Hill in Freetown.

Career
Yambassu played for several youth clubs throughout the east end of Freetown before he was finally signed by his hometown club the Wellington People F.C. of the Sierra Leone National Premier League.

International career
He was a member of the Sierra Leone national team and is commonly known in Sierra Leone by his nickname Politics.

References

Sierra Leonean footballers
1984 births
Living people
Association football goalkeepers
People from Koidu